Robert Blackwell Docking (October 9, 1925October 8, 1983) was an American politician who served as the 38th governor of Kansas from 1967 until 1975.

Early life 
Born in Kansas City, Missouri, Docking attended public school in Lawrence, Kansas, before attending the University of Kansas, and served in the United States Army Air Forces during World War II. After the war, Docking moved to Arkansas City, Kansas, where he became a successful banker, and was elected mayor.

Political career 
Docking was elected governor in 1966 as a member of the Democratic Party over the incumbent Republican, William Avery, whom Docking harangued for leaving the state when there was work to be done in Kansas. Docking served more terms than any other Kansas governor, but is tied for length of service because of a constitutional amendment approved during his final term which provided that Kansas governors serve four-year terms, and are constitutionally prohibited from running for more than two terms. He was known for his commitment to farmers, small business owners, and the environment.

The son of former Gov. George Docking (1957–1961), he was married to Meredith and they had two sons, William and Tom, the latter of whom served as lieutenant governor and ran unsuccessfully for the governorship in 1986. After his service as governor, Docking resumed his former profession of banking in Arkansas City. He donated his papers to the University of Kansas rather than give them to the Kansas State Historical Society, where the papers of his 34 predecessors are stored, with the exception of his father, who burned his gubernatorial papers.

Death and legacy
He died of emphysema in 1983 in Merriam, Kansas, the day before his 58th birthday, and is interred in Highland Park Cemetery in Kansas City, Kansas, in a plot adjoining his parents'.

A state office building across the street from the capital in Topeka, Kansas, bears his name, and his bank in Arkansas City (Union State Bank), which is still owned by the Dockings, is on the National Register of Historic Places. In addition, the entire length of U.S. Route 77 in Cowley County, Kansas (which contains Arkansas City) is known as the Robert B. Docking Memorial Highway.

His son, Thomas Docking, was Lt. Governor of Kansas during the tenure of John Carlin as governor.

His daughter-in-law, and Thomas' wife, Jill Docking, was the unsuccessful Democratic nominee to succeed Bob Dole in the 1996 U.S. Senate election, losing to Sam Brownback. She was the Democratic nominee for Lieutenant Governor in the 2014 elections (Paul Davis was the gubernatorial candidate and her running mate).

External links
 Governor's mansion tour guide information
 National Governor's Association Biography
 
http://www.kansas.gov
Publications concerning Kansas Governor Robert Docking's administration available via the KGI Online Library

1925 births
1983 deaths
Politicians from Kansas City, Missouri
American Presbyterians
Democratic Party governors of Kansas
Politicians from Lawrence, Kansas
University of Kansas alumni
United States Army Air Forces personnel of World War II
People from Arkansas City, Kansas
American bankers
Mayors of places in Kansas
Deaths from emphysema
20th-century American politicians
Businesspeople from Kansas City, Missouri
Docking family
20th-century American businesspeople